Kingston East and Port Royal is a parliamentary constituency represented in the House of Representatives of the Jamaican Parliament. It elects one Member of Parliament MP by the first past the post system of election. It is one of the original 32 Parliamentary seats.

Boundaries 

Constituency includes Norman Gardens, lower areas of Mountain View Avenue, Rockfort, Windward Road, Port Royal and Springfield.

Members of Parliament

Elections

References 

Parliamentary constituencies of Jamaica